Stigmella omelkoi is a moth of the family Nepticulidae. It is found in Russia (Primorskiy Kray), Japan (Hokkaido) and China (Heilongjiang).

The wingspan is 4.7-5.6 mm. There are two generations per year. Adults are on wing in May–June and again from July to early September.

The larvae feed on Quercus mongolica (including var. grosseserrata in Japan) and Quercus serrata (in Japan). They mine the leaves of their host plant. The mine consists of a long gallery, first with linear or narrow dispersed black frass. In the last instar it is filled with green coiled frass, filling about half of the mine width. The mine is much wider than at the beginning.

External links
Nepticulidae (Lepidoptera) in China, 1. Introduction and Stigmella (Schrank) feeding on Fagaceae

Nepticulidae
Moths of Asia
Moths described in 1984